Daniel Simon Aegerter (born July 20, 1969) is a Swiss businessman and venture capitalist. Formerly founder and CEO of Tradex Technologies, he later founded Armada Investment AG to manage his wealth. He was an early investor in Nutmeg (company), N26, Lilium GmbH, and Commonwealth Fusion Systems.

Early life
Daniel Aegerter was born in Bern, Switzerland. His father, Simon, is a physicist and the founder of the Swiss Science Center Technorama. His mother, Irene, is also a physicist and a former member of the Swiss Commission for Nuclear Safety

Career
At the age of 18, Aegerter founded his first company, Megabyte.

In 1988, at the age of 19, Aegerter founded Dynabit, an importer and distributor of Apple Macintosh peripherals, particularly for those used in electronic publishing. At that time, he was working as an intern for Swiss Bank Corporation. He received a loan of 250,000 Swiss francs from Zug Cantonal Bank.

In 1990, he moved to Tampa with his wife to start a computer trading business.

In 1996, he founded Tradex Technologies as an Internet-based system for automating the purchase of computer equipment distributed by Dynabit.

In December 1999, SAP Ariba agreed to acquire the company for $1.9 billion in stock. By the time the deal closed in March 2000, the stock was worth $5.6 billion and Aegarter was a billionaire on paper.

After the dot-com bubble burst, Aegarter's fortune dwindled to 500 million Swiss francs.

He formed Armada Investment Group, a family office to manage his wealth. He capitalized the company with $120 million.

Aegerter was a member of the Board of Directors of EUNetworks from 2010 to 2018 and of Nutmeg (company) from 2012 to 2019.

He is the co-founder of Emergency Reactor alongside activist Zion Lights and Robert Stone.

Aegerter is a member of World Minds

Personal life
Aegerter is married and has 2 sons. He owns a $12 million mansion in Zumikon.

Sponsorships
In July 2019, the "Medium Goal" tournament, both founded and sponsored by Daniel Aegerter, took place for the 14th time.

Nuclear power
In February 2017, Aegerter and other investors invested a total of USD 4.5 million in the startup Transatomic Power.

Armada VC investments
Aegerter's investment firm "Armada VC" invested a total of $3 million in Flytrex in January 2017, along with several angel investors, to enable drone deliveries.

Armada Investment participated in a collection campaign of the German pension platform Xpension in April 2020. A total of 25 million EUR was raised. In October 2020, Armada Investment supported the Swiss regulator, which was close to approval.

Movies
In 2020, the film "Chasing the Moon", of which Aegerter was one of the producers, was awarded a Creative Arts Emmy.

References

1969 births
Living people
Swiss businesspeople
Swiss-German people
People from Bern